William McLaren may refer to:

Sports
 Bill McLaren (1923–2010), Scottish rugby union player and commentator
 Billy McLaren (born 1948), Scottish football player and manager
 William McLaren (footballer) (1887–?), Scottish footballer (Cowdenbeath, Huddersfield Town)
 William McLaren (sport shooter) (1881–1962), Canadian Olympic sports shooter
 Willie McLaren (born 1984), Scottish footballer
 Willie McLaren (1930s footballer), Scottish footballer

Others
 William McLaren (illustrator) (1923–1987), Scottish illustrator
 William Edward McLaren (1831–1905), Bishop of Chicago, Illinois
 Bill McLaren (public servant) (1898–1973), Australian public servant in the Department of the Interior

See also 
 William McLaren Bristol (1860–1935), co-founder of Bristol-Myers Squibb